Shekalovka is a rural locality (a selo) and the administrative center of Shekalovskoye Rural Settlement, Rossoshansky District, Voronezh Oblast, Russia. The population was 625 as of 2010. There are 8 streets.

Geography 
Shekalovka is located 32 km northwest of Rossosh (the district's administrative centre) by road. Novosyolovka is the nearest rural locality.

References 

Rural localities in Rossoshansky District